USS Volunteer has been the name of more than one United States Navy ship, and may refer to:

 , a steamer in commission from 1864 to 1865
 , the proposed designation for a motorboat inspected for service in 1918 but never placed in service with the Navy
 , a collier in commission from 1918 to 1919

United States Navy ship names